Geremy Lombardi (born 4 April 1996) is a footballer who plays as a forward for Pro Piacenza. Born in Italy, he represents the Dominican Republic national team.

Club career
Lombardi has played for the youth system of Inter Milan and Parma.

International career
Lombardi was eligible for both Italy and Dominican Republic on senior international level due to being born to an Italian father and Dominican mother. He represented Italy at youth level. He made his international debut for Dominican Republic on 25 March 2015, as a starter in a 3–0 friendly lost against Cuba, being substituted at the 68th minute.

Career statistics
Scores and results list Dominican Republic's goal tally first.

References

External links
 Pro Piacenza Profile

1996 births
Living people
People from San Juan de la Maguana
Dominican Republic footballers
Dominican Republic international footballers
Italian footballers
Italy youth international footballers
Dominican Republic people of Italian descent
Italian people of Dominican Republic descent
Sportspeople of Dominican Republic descent
Association football forwards
Serie C players
Serie D players
A.C. Monza players
A.S. Pro Piacenza 1919 players